Dennis Oh is an American model and actor based in South Korea.

Early life and education 

Oh majored in photography at the Savannah College of Art and Design. He is an artist whose hobbies include drawing, traveling, and photography.

Career 
Oh started modeling at the age of 16 and won the 22nd Korean model "Best Dressed" in 2005.

Oh starred in the MBC miniseries Sweet Spy ("Dalkom-han Seupai") and has also acted in commercials across Asia, including Hong Kong, China and Singapore. In the drama, he appears as a mysterious spy who falls in love with an ordinary female police officer. 

He appeared in an episode of the 2009 series of Melrose Place. In 2016, he is starring in Chinese film Papa.

He has fans in numerous countries, such as South Korea, China, and Thailand.

Filmography

Films

Television

Awards
22nd Korean Model "Best Dressed", 2005
1st Drama Awards "Best Leading Actor", 2006
5th Esquire of the Year "Best Fashion Star", 2008
Cosmopolitan Beauty Awards "The Gentleman", 2011

References

External links

South Korean male film actors
South Korean male models
South Korean male television actors
South Korean people of American descent
American emigrants to South Korea
American male actors of Korean descent
American models of Korean descent
American people of South Korean descent
1981 births
Living people
21st-century South Korean male actors